Sardar Tara Singh (1938 – 19 September 2020) was an Indian politician, the leader of Bharatiya Janata Party, and a member of the Maharashtra Legislative Assembly elected from the Mulund assembly constituency in Mumbai.

On 21 February 2017, 300 party workers from different political parties attending the Brihanmumbai Municipal Corporation elections protested the presence of Singh at a polling booth in Gavanpada by attacking his car.

References

People from Mumbai Suburban district
1938 births
2020 deaths
Maharashtra MLAs 2014–2019
Marathi politicians
Bharatiya Janata Party politicians from Maharashtra